Pentachaeta is a genus of the family Asteraceae; the entire genus is endemic to California.  Of the six species members, at least one, Pentachaeta bellidiflora, is classified as an endangered species.  The etymology of the genus name derives from Greek: Penta = five + chaeta = bristle, referring to the pappus scales of P. aurea. It was combined in Chaetopappa, but later work led to the genus being recognized as definitely separate. It is most closely related to Rigiopappus and Tracyina. Pygmydaisy is a common name for Pentachaeta.

Description
This genus consists of annual plants whose above surface architecture emanates from slender taproot, which appears smooth, but actually is covered by fine hairs.  The stems are typically simple or branching in the lower half of plant, and they are erect, generally flexible, and of green to reddish color.  Pentachaeta leaves are normally narrowly linear, ciliate and green.  The terminal inflorescences are solitary with heads radiate, disciform or discoid; peduncles manifest as wispy with bell-shaped involucres measuring three to seven millimeters.  This genus has green phyllaries in two to three generally equal series, lanceolate to obovate, with margins widely scarious, and a naked receptacle.  The white, yellow or red corolla may be simplified to a tube.  The disk shaped flowers manifest linear, acute style tips.  Fruits are 1.5 to 3.0 millimeters in diameter and are generally compressed in an oblong-fusiform shape and are typically covered with small hairs.  Each species presents fragile pappuses with slender bristles.

References

External links
 Calflora Database: species of the genus Pentachaeta
UC CalPhotos gallery of Pentachaeta species

Asteraceae genera
Endemic flora of California
Natural history of the California chaparral and woodlands
Taxa named by Carl Linnaeus
Astereae